TUSEM Essen  is a handball club from Essen, Germany. Currently, they compete in the 2. Handball-Bundesliga.

Accomplishments
Handball-Bundesliga: 3
: 1986, 1987, 1989
DHB-Pokal: 3
: 1988, 1991, 1992
EHF Champions League: 1
: 1988
EHF Cup Winner's Cup: 1
: 1989
EHF Cup: 1
: 2005
EHF Challenge Cup: 1
: 1994

Team

Current squad
Squad for the 2022–23 season

Goalkeepers
1  Arne Fuchs
 12  Sebastian Bliß
 16  Lukas Diedrich

Left wingers
 68  Tim Michel Mast
 73  Finley Werschkull
Right wingers
 21  Felix Eißing
 34  Felix Klingler
Line players
 10  Finn Wolfram
 14  Markus Dangers

Left backs
3  Jonas Ellwanger
 22  Dennis Szczęsny
 28  Malte Seidel
Centre backs
 15  Nils Homscheid
 25  Justin Müller
 33  Eloy Morante Maldonado
Right backs
8  Tim Rozman
 77  Alexander Schoss

Transfers
Transfers for the 2023–24 season

 Joining

 Leaving
  Eloy Morante Maldonado (CB) (to  Bergischer HC)

References

External links

German handball clubs
Handball-Bundesliga
Handball clubs established in 2000
2000 establishments in Germany
Sport in Essen